Zvunka is a surname of Romanian origin (Romanian language: Zvuncă). Notable people with the surname include: 

Georges Zvunka (born 1937), French footballer
Jules Zvunka (born 1941), French footballer
Victor Zvunka (born 1951), French footballer

Surnames of Romanian origin